Dachchan (also Romanized as Dachchān) is a village in Sofla Rural District, Zavareh District, Ardestan County, Isfahan Province, Iran. At the 2006 census, its population was 10, in 6 families.

References 

Populated places in Ardestan County